The 1998–99 season saw Dunfermline Athletic compete in the Scottish Premier League where they finished in 10th position with 28 points, suffering relegation to the 1999–2000 Scottish First Division.

Final league table

Results
Dunfermline Athletic's score comes first

Legend

Scottish Premier League

Scottish Cup

Scottish League Cup

References

External links
 Dunfermline Athletic 1998–99 at Soccerbase.com (select relevant season from dropdown list)

Dunfermline Athletic F.C. seasons
Dunfermline Athletic